Chettri is an Indian surname. Spellings include Chetri, Chhetri and Chhetry.

Notable people with the surname include:

Chetri 

 Aman Chetri (born 2001), Indian footballer
 Hem Chetri (born 2000), Indian cricketer
 Laxman Chetri (born 1996), Indian cricketer
 Mani Kumar Chetri (born 1920), Indian cardiologist
 Rewati Chetri (born 1993), Indian model and beauty pageant winner

Chettri 
Ashish Chettri (born 1992), Indian footballer
Bipul Chettri, Indian singer
Bir Bahadur Chettri (born 1955), Indian Olympic hockey player
Bharat Chettri (born 1982), Indian field hockey player
Laxman Chettri (born 1992), Indian cricketer
Lil Bahadur Chettri, Indian writer
Nirmal Chettri (born 1990), Indian footballer
Ram Bahadur Chettri (1937–2000), Indian footballer
Rohit John Chettri (born 1991), Nepali singer, musician, music producer and lyricist
Sabin Chettri (born 1994), Indian cricketer

Chhetri 
 Ajay Chhetri (born 1999), Indian footballer
 Bijay Chhetri (born 2001), Indian footballer
 Bikash Singh Chhetri (born 1992), Nepalese footballer
 Dinesh Chhetri, Bhutanese footballer active in 2002
 Jit Bahadur Khatri Chhetri (born 1947), Nepalese Olympic long-distance runner
 Krishna Bahadur Chhetri (born 1935), Indian politician
 Mahesh Chhetri (born 1988), Nepalese cricketer
 Nanda Lal Roka Chhetri, Nepalese politician
 Raj Bahadur Buda Chhetri, Nepalese politician
 Rajendra Chhetri (born 1960), Nepalese army officer, Chief of Army Staff 2015–2018
 Sanjog Chhetri (1982–2003), Indian paratrooper
 Shailesh Thapa Chhetri (born 1968), Inspector General of Nepal Police
 Shanta Chhetri, Indian politician
 Sunil Chhetri (born 1984), Indian football team captain and prolific goalscorer
 Sushil Chhetri, Nepalese actor
 Til Bahadur Mahat Chhetri, Nepalese politician
 Vinod Singh Chhetri (1935–2019), Nepalese geologist
 Yagya Bahadur Budha Chhetri, Nepalese politician

Chhetry 

 Rubina Chhetry (born 1993), Napali cricketer